Kanneganti Lalithakumari (born 5 May 1971) is an Indian judge. She is currently serving as a judge of the Telangana High Court. She is former judge of Andhra Pradesh High Court.

Early life and education 
She was born in Cheruvu Jammulapalem village.  After attending St.Theresa's and Nagarjuna Junior College in Hyderabad she graduated with Bachelor of Arts degree from Vanitha Mahavidyalaya Nampally Hyderabad in 1991. Thereafter, she obtained Bachelor of Laws degree from Padala Rama Reddi Law college, Osmania University in 1994.

Career 
she enrolled as an Advocate on 28.12.1994 in the composite Bar Council of Andhra Pradesh and commenced practice by joining the chambers of Sri M.R.K. Choudary, Sri K.Harinath and Sri O.Manohar Reddy and developed independent practice within a short span of time. Her Lordship practiced in all areas of law including Civil, Criminal, Constitutional, Taxation, Service, Non-Service, Motor Accident Claims and Matrimonial Cases. Her Lordship was the Standing Counsel for Agriculture Market Committees, English and Foreign Languages University, Tirumala Tirupati Devasthanams, Endowments, Sri Venkateswara Vedic University, Sri Venkateswara Institute of Medical Sciences (SVIMS) and Sanskrit University, Tirupati.

Notable judgements 
 Covid-19 migrant worker crisis (K. Ramakrishna vs Union of India)
Vizag LG polymer gas leak (Suo motu PIL)
Suo motu for non compliance of orders on medical examination
Decongestion of prisons - Release of all convicts, under trial prisoners on interim bail for 90 days
Guidelines for Prompt Transmission of Bail Orders
implemented guidelines issued by supreme court in Arnesh kumar's case

References 

Indian judges
Living people
21st-century judges
People from Guntur district
21st-century Indian women judges
Judges of the Andhra Pradesh High Court
1971 births